Robert Frederick Murray (born November 26, 1954) is a Canadian professional ice hockey executive and former player. He most recently served as the general manager of the Anaheim Ducks of the National Hockey League. Murray played in the NHL from 1975 to 1990 as a defenceman with the Chicago Black Hawks. He played in two NHL All-Star Games and helped the Black Hawks reach the NHL playoff semifinals five times in a nine-year stretch.

Playing career

Junior hockey
Murray played for the Cornwall Royals of the Quebec Major Junior Hockey League (QMJHL) from 1971 to 1974. He won a Memorial Cup in 1972. After scoring 99 points as a defender in his final junior season, he was drafted 52nd overall by the Black Hawks in the 1974 NHL Amateur Draft.

Professional hockey
After playing with the Dallas Black Hawks of the Central Hockey League in 1974–75, he joined the Chicago Black Hawks for the 1975–76 season. After developing a leadership role with the team, Murray served as Chicago's interim captain for two months of the 1985–86 season (November 1985 to January 1986) while captain Darryl Sutter was out of the lineup with an injury. Other than starting the 1988–89 season briefly in the IHL, Murray spent 15 consecutive seasons with Chicago, finishing his career with a postseason loss to the Edmonton Oilers on May 12, 1990.

In 1,008 career NHL games, Murray amassed 132 goals and 382 assists. As a member of the Campbell Conference team, he appeared in both the 33rd National Hockey League All-Star Game in February 1981 and the 35th National Hockey League All-Star Game in February 1983.

Post-playing career
The Blackhawks hired Murray as their director of player personnel in 1991, and he became the sixth general manager in Blackhawks' history on July 3, 1997. He served as general manager of the Blackhawks from 1997 to December 1999, when he was fired 22 games into his third season with Chicago in last place in the Central Division. Murray briefly worked as a scouting consultant for the Mighty Ducks of Anaheim before becoming a professional scout for the Vancouver Canucks from 1999 to 2005.

On July 14, 2005, Murray became the Ducks' senior vice president of hockey operations, working with Anaheim general manager Brian Burke and overseeing all aspects of player development. He won the Stanley Cup in this role with the Ducks in 2007.

Murray replaced Burke as the Ducks' general manager on November 12, 2008, when Burke abruptly left the job to become the Toronto Maple Leafs' general manager and president later in the month. The Ducks made the Stanley Cup playoffs in eight of Murray's first 10 seasons in charge, reaching two Western Conference finals and winning five consecutive Pacific Division titles from 2012-17. Murray won the NHL's Jim Gregory General Manager of the Year award for the 2013–14 season after the Ducks finished atop the Western Conference with a franchise-record 116 points.

On February 10, 2019, Murray fired head coach Randy Carlyle for the second time in their Anaheim careers and assumed the head coaching position himself for the final 26 games of the 2018–19 season. Murray returned exclusively to the front office later that summer, hiring Dallas Eakins as the Ducks' new head coach.

On November 9, 2021, Murray was placed on administrative leave by the Anaheim Ducks pending the results of an ongoing investigation. The investigation is reportedly focused on Murray's alleged history of verbal abuse to players and staff members. The following day, November 10, Murray resigned from his position and informed the team he planned to enter treatment for alcohol abuse. At the time of his resignation, Murray was the  tenured general manager in the league.

Less than five months later, in February 2022, Murray reportedly joined the Calgary Flames as a scout.

Career statistics

Head coaching record

Awards
 Jim Gregory General Manager of the Year Award (2014)

See also
 List of NHL players with 1,000 games played

References

External links
 
 Anaheim Ducks profile
 Bob Murray's trades as GM of the Ducks
 Bob Murray's trades as GM of the Black Hawks

1954 births
Living people
Anaheim Ducks executives
Anaheim Ducks scouts
Canadian ice hockey defencemen
Canadian people of Scottish descent
Chicago Blackhawks captains
Chicago Blackhawks draft picks
Chicago Blackhawks executives
Chicago Blackhawks players
Cincinnati Stingers draft picks
Cornwall Royals (QMJHL) players
Dallas Black Hawks players
Ice hockey people from Ontario
Sportspeople from Kingston, Ontario
National Hockey League All-Stars
Saginaw Hawks players
Stanley Cup champions
Vancouver Canucks scouts